The Arc of Statehood is a series of 39 bronze markers mounted on sandstone blocks by Capitol Lake on the Washington State Capitol campus, in Olympia, Washington, United States. The markers were installed in 2002.

References

2002 establishments in Washington (state)
Bronze sculptures in Washington (state)
Outdoor sculptures in Olympia, Washington
Sandstone sculptures in the United States
Washington State Capitol campus